The Senate of Lesotho is the upper chamber of the Parliament of Lesotho, which, along with the National Assembly of Lesotho (the lower chamber), comprises the legislature of Lesotho.

Bicameralism in Lesotho is specifically modeled after the Westminster system of the United Kingdom, having an upper house weaker than the lower. As such, the Senate holds less power than the National Assembly; it cannot initiate legislation, it does not appoint the Prime Minister, and it does not participate in motions of confidence. The Senate's consent is required to amend certain clauses of the constitution, and for a bill to become law, it must be passed by both chambers of Parliament.

The current Senate has a total of 33 members. 22 are hereditary tribal chiefs who perform executive functions for their respective communities and 11 are nominated by the King  on the Prime Minister's advice and generally align with the King in their legislative behavior. Members serve five-year terms. Senators may not serve simultaneously as members of the National Assembly. 

Mamonaheng Mokitimi is the current president of the Senate. She succeeded Prince Seeiso Bereng Seeiso.

See also
National Assembly of Lesotho - the lower chamber of Parliament
History of Lesotho
Legislative branch
List of national legislatures
List of presidents of the Senate of Lesotho

References

External links
Senate of Lesotho - Official site

Government of Lesotho
Lesotho
1965 establishments in Basutoland